Dmytro Ihorovych Antonov (born 28 August 1996) is a professional Ukrainian football defender who plays for Naftovyk Okhtyrka in the Ukrainian Amateur League.

Career
Antonov is a product of the Metalist Kharkiv System.

He made his debut for Metalist Kharkiv in the match against Dynamo Kyiv on 1 March 2015 in the Ukrainian Premier League.

In May 2015, Antonov was disqualified for 4 years by FFU Control and Disciplinary Committee for the use of a prohibited substance metandienone.

References

External links
 
 

1996 births
Living people
Ukrainian footballers
FC Metalist Kharkiv players
FC Olympik Kharkiv players
FC Naftovyk-Ukrnafta Okhtyrka players
Ukrainian Premier League players
Ukrainian Second League players
Ukrainian sportspeople in doping cases
Doping cases in association football

Association football defenders